January 16 - Eastern Orthodox liturgical calendar - January 18

All fixed commemorations below are observed on January 30 by Eastern Orthodox Churches on the Old Calendar.

For January 17th, Orthodox Churches on the Old Calendar commemorate the Saints listed on January 4.

Saints
 Venerable Anthony the Great, God-bearing father of monasticism (356)
 Martyr Jonilla and her infant son Turbo (c. 161-180)  (see also: January 16 )
 Saint Theodosius the Great, Roman Emperor (395)
 Venerable Achilles the Confessor, hermit of Egypt (5th century)
 Venerable Anthony the New Wonderworker, of Veria in Greece, near the Haliacmon river (11th century)

Pre-Schism Western saints
 Saints Genulfus (Genou) and Genitus, two monks who lived in Celle-sur-Nahon in France (c. 3rd century)
 Venerable Antony, Merulus and John, three monks at St Andrew's on the Coelian Hill in Rome (6th century)
 Saint Nennius (Ninnidh), disciple of St Finian of Clonard, reckoned as one of the 'Twelve Apostles of Ireland' (6th century)
 Saint Sulpicius II Pius (Severus the Pious), Bishop of Bourges (647)
 Saint Mildgyth, a Benedictine nun and later abbess of a Northumbrian convent (c. 676)
 Saint Richimirus, under the patronage of the Bishop of Le Mans, he founded the monastery later called Saint-Rigomer-des-Bois (715)
 Saint Joseph of Freising, Bishop of Freising (764)

Post-Schism Orthodox saints
 Saint Anthony the Roman of Novgorod, Abbot (1147)
 Saint Anthony, Abbot of Dymsk in Novgorod (1224)
 Saint Anthony of Chernoezersk (Anthony of Black Lake), monk (c. 14th century)
 Saint Anthony of Krasny Kholm, monk (1481)
 Venerable Anthony of Meteora (Anthony Kantakouzènos), founder and Abbot of the Monastery of St. Stephen at Meteora (15th century)
 Venerable Philotheos of Meteora, second founder of the Monastery of St. Stephen at Meteora (16th century)
 Saint Macarius (Kalogeras), Hierodeacon, of Patmos (1737)
 New Martyr George of Ioannina (1838)

New martyrs and confessors
 New Hieromartyr Victor Evropeytsev, Priest (1931)
 New Hieromartyr Paul Uspensky, Priest (1938)

Other commemorations
 Repose of St. Anthony, Bishop of Vologda (1588)  (Feast day October 26)
 Repose of Schema-abbot Herman of Zosima Hermitage (1923)
 Repose of Archimandrite Tikhon (Bogoslovtsev) of Inkerman (1950)
 Repose of Bishop Sava (Sarachevich) of Edmonton (1973)

Icon gallery

Notes

References

Sources
 January 17/January 30. Orthodox Calendar (PRAVOSLAVIE.RU).
 January 30 / January 17. HOLY TRINITY RUSSIAN ORTHODOX CHURCH (A parish of the Patriarchate of Moscow).
 January 17. OCA - The Lives of the Saints.
 The Autonomous Orthodox Metropolia of Western Europe and the Americas (ROCOR). St. Hilarion Calendar of Saints for the year of our Lord 2004. St. Hilarion Press (Austin, TX). p. 8.
 January 17. Latin Saints of the Orthodox Patriarchate of Rome.
 The Roman Martyrology. Transl. by the Archbishop of Baltimore. Last Edition, According to the Copy Printed at Rome in 1914. Revised Edition, with the Imprimatur of His Eminence Cardinal Gibbons. Baltimore: John Murphy Company, 1916. pp. 17–18.
Greek Sources
 Great Synaxaristes:  17 ΙΑΝΟΥΑΡΙΟΥ. ΜΕΓΑΣ ΣΥΝΑΞΑΡΙΣΤΗΣ.
  Συναξαριστής. 17 Ιανουαρίου. ECCLESIA.GR. (H ΕΚΚΛΗΣΙΑ ΤΗΣ ΕΛΛΑΔΟΣ). 
Russian Sources
  30 января (17 января). Православная Энциклопедия под редакцией Патриарха Московского и всея Руси Кирилла (электронная версия). (Orthodox Encyclopedia - Pravenc.ru).
  17 января (ст.ст.) 30 января 2013 (нов. ст.). Русская Православная Церковь Отдел внешних церковных связей. (DECR).

January in the Eastern Orthodox calendar